The Inn on the River (/ The Inn on the Thames) is a 1962 West German crime film directed by Alfred Vohrer and starring Joachim Fuchsberger, Eddi Arent and Klaus Kinski. It is part of a cycle of films based on the novels of Edgar Wallace, produced in West Germany in the 1950s and 1960s.

Cast
 Joachim Fuchsberger as Inspector Wade
 Brigitte Grothum as Leila Smith
 Elisabeth Flickenschildt as Nelly Oaks
 Klaus Kinski as Gregor Gubanow
 Eddi Arent as Barnaby
 Richard Münch as Dr. Collins
 Jan Hendriks as Roger Lane
 Heinz Engelmann as Mr. Broen
 Siegfried Schürenberg as Sir John
  as Anna Smith
 Hans Paetsch as Solicitor
  as Big Willy

Production
It was shot at the Wandsbek Studios in Hamburg. The film's sets were designed by the art directors Mathias Matthies and Ellen Schmidt. As with other early entries in the series it was made in black and white.

The script was based on Edgar Wallace's 1929 novel The India-Rubber Men. Cinematography took place at Hamburg from 6 June to 11 July 1962.

Reception
The FSK gave the film a rating of "16 and older" and found it not appropriate for screenings on public holidays.

References

External links

1962 films
1960s mystery films
1960s crime thriller films
German mystery films
German crime thriller films
West German films
1960s German-language films
German black-and-white films
Films directed by Alfred Vohrer
Films based on British novels
Films based on works by Edgar Wallace
Films produced by Horst Wendlandt
Films set in London
Films shot at Wandsbek Studios
Constantin Film films
Underwater action films
1960s German films